The canton of Volonne is a former administrative division in southeastern France. It was disbanded following the French canton reorganisation which came into effect in March 2015. It had 11,886 inhabitants (2012).

The canton comprised the following communes:

Aubignosc
Château-Arnoux-Saint-Auban
Châteauneuf-Val-Saint-Donat
L'Escale
Montfort
Peipin
Salignac
Sourribes
Volonne

Demographics

See also
Cantons of the Alpes-de-Haute-Provence department

References

Former cantons of Alpes-de-Haute-Provence
2015 disestablishments in France
States and territories disestablished in 2015